Tony Stone (born 1982) is an American music producer and project developer for Christian hip hop artists. He has produced the music to hundreds of songs in the genre. He is currently the Project Manager for Reflection Music Group.

Production discography

 Production contributed to these albums
 After the Music Stops, Lecrae
 Rehab: The Overdose, Lecrae
 If They Only Knew, Trip Lee
 20/20, Trip Lee
 Between Two Worlds, Trip Lee
 Kingdom People, Tedashii
 Identity Crisis, Tedashii
 Our World: Fallen, Flame
 Our World: Redeemed, Flame
 Captured, Flame
 116 Compilation, 116 Clique
 13 Letters, 116 Clique
 Turn My Life Up, Sho Baraka
 Chronicles, The Cross Movement
 Crime & Consequences, Phanatik
 The Chop Chop: From Milk to Meat, Ambassador
 Shades of Grey, Braille
 Box of Rhymes, Braille
 Heavy Rotation, Hiphop Is Music (Braille)
 Extra Credit, Theory Hazit
 Storiez, Shai Linne
 The Atonement, Shai Linne
 The Church (Compilation)
 The Big Picture, Da Truth
 Manumit, Dre Murray
 Revolutionary Theme Music, R-Swift
 Behind the Musik, KJ-52
 Five-Two Television, KJ-52
 Boggie Root, DJ Maj
 More Than Music, Promise
 Slow Burn, Sev Statik

Awards and achievements

References

External links

Tony Stone's Production Company

1982 births
Living people
Musicians from Virginia
Performers of Christian hip hop music